This is a list of international, national and subnational flags used in Europe.

Supranational and international flags
An incomplete list of flags representing intra-European international and supranational organisations, which omits intercontinental organisations such as the United Nations:

Flags of European sovereign states

Flags of other European sovereign entities

Disputed or partially recognised states

Flags of European dependencies

Flags of European sub-divisions

Austria

Belarus

Belgium

Bosnia and Herzegovina

Finland

Not all regions have selected an official flag.

France

Not all regions have selected an official flag.

Georgia

Germany

Many states have separate civil and state versions of their flags; the state flags (listed) include the state arms, while the civil versions don't. See Flags of German states.

Greece

Ireland

Italy

Malta

Netherlands

Poland

Portugal

Russia

Serbia

Spain

Sweden

Switzerland

Ukraine

United Kingdom

Flags of European cities

Flags of cities with over 1 million inhabitants:

Historical flags

Supranational and international flags

Notes

References

External links

See also 

 Flag of Europe
 Armorial of Europe
 Flag of the Romani people

 Lists of flags of European countries
 List of Albanian flags
 List of Andorran flags
 List of Armenian flags
 List of Austrian flags
 List of Azerbaijani flags
 List of Belarusian flags
 List of Belgian flags
 List of flags of Bosnia and Herzegovina
 List of Bulgarian flags
 List of Croatian flags
 List of Cypriot flags
 List of Czech flags
 List of Danish flags
 List of Estonian flags
 List of flags of Finland
 List of French flags
 List of Breton flags
 List of Corsican flags
 List of flags of Georgia (country)
 List of German flags
 List of Greek flags
 List of Hungarian flags
 List of Icelandic flags
 List of flags of Ireland
 List of Italian flags
 List of Kazakh flags
List of flags of Kosovo
 List of flags of Latvia
 List of Liechtensteinian flags
 List of flags of Lithuania
 List of flags of Luxembourg
 List of flags of Malta
 List of flags of Moldova
 List of Monégasque flags
 List of flags of Montenegro
 List of flags of the Netherlands
 Flags of North Macedonia
 List of flags of Norway
 List of Polish flags
 List of Portuguese flags
 List of flags of Romania
 List of Russian flags
 List of Sammarinese flags
 List of Serbian flags
 List of Slovak flags
 List of Slovenian flags
 List of Spanish flags
 List of flags of Sweden
 List of Swiss flags
 List of Turkish flags
 List of Ukrainian flags
 List of United Kingdom flags
 List of English flags
 List of Cornish flags
 List of Northern Irish flags
 List of Scottish flags
 List of Welsh flags
 List of Vatican flags
 Flags of Austria-Hungary
 List of Soviet flags
 List of Yugoslav flags

 Other pages about European flags
 Nordic Cross flag
 Pan-Slavic colours

 
Europe
Europe-related lists
Europe